Group F of the 2014 FIFA World Cup consisted of Argentina, Bosnia and Herzegovina, Iran and Nigeria. Play began on 15 June and ended on 25 June 2014. The top two teams, Argentina and Nigeria, advanced to the round of 16.

Teams

Notes

Standings

Argentina advanced to play Switzerland (runner-up of Group E) in the round of 16.
Nigeria advanced to play France (winner of Group E) in the round of 16.

Matches

Argentina vs Bosnia and Herzegovina
The two teams had met in two previous matches, both in friendlies, most recently in 2013, both won by Argentina.

Bosnia and Herzegovina conceded three minutes into their World Cup debut, when Lionel Messi's free kick from the left was flicked on by Marcos Rojo and bounced off Sead Kolašinac into the net for an own goal. In the second half, Messi played a one-two with substitute Gonzalo Higuaín and shot home from the edge of the penalty area with his left foot into the bottom-right corner. With five minutes remaining in normal time, Bosnia and Herzegovina pulled one back, when Senad Lulić's pass found substitute Vedad Ibišević to score the country's first ever World Cup goal, shooting under the goalkeeper with his left foot.

Kolašinac's own goal after two minutes and nine seconds broke the record for the fastest own goal in the history of the FIFA World Cup, surpassing Carlos Gamarra's own goal (two minutes and 46 seconds) in Paraguay's first group stage match against England at the 2006 FIFA World Cup.

Iran vs Nigeria
The two teams had met in one previous match, in the 1998 Lunar New Year Cup, won 1–0 by Nigeria.

In a goalless game of few chances, Iran's Reza Ghoochannejhad forced a save from Vincent Enyeama in the first half, while Nigeria substitute Shola Ameobi headed wide in the second half.

This was the first goalless match as well as the first draw of the tournament after the previous 12 matches all produced a winner, and was the longest wait for a draw in a single tournament since 1930, where there were no draws in the entire tournament. This was also the first clean sheet kept by Iran in the World Cup.

Argentina vs Iran

The two teams had met in one previous match, in a friendly in 1977, won on penalties by Argentina after a 1–1 draw .

In a match where Argentina dominated in terms of possession and shots, they scored the only goal one minute into second half injury time when Lionel Messi received a pass from Ezequiel Lavezzi on the right wing, dribbled inside and curled a left-footed shot past the outstretched hands of the Iranian keeper Alireza Haghighi. Before the goal, Iran had chances to score, but Argentina goalkeeper Sergio Romero was able to save Ashkan Dejagah's header and Reza Ghoochannejhad's shot, and Dejagah also had a penalty appeal turned down when Argentina defender Pablo Zabaleta tackled him in the area but only just got his toe to the ball. With the win, Argentina were guaranteed to advance to the knockout stage.

Nigeria vs Bosnia and Herzegovina

The two teams had never met before.

Bosnia and Herzegovina thought they had taken the lead when Edin Džeko put the ball into the net, but his effort was ruled out for offside, which replays later showed to be an incorrect decision. Referee Peter O'Leary later admitted Džeko's goal was disallowed in error. Seven minutes later, Nigeria took the lead when Emmanuel Emenike burst past Emir Spahić to cross for Peter Odemwingie to score, firing in through the legs of Asmir Begovic. Džeko came closest to scoring the equaliser to keep his team's qualification chances alive, but his shot in second-half stoppage time was deflected onto the post by Nigeria goalkeeper Vincent Enyeama. Nigeria held for the win and eliminated Bosnia and Herzegovina as a result.

Nigeria vs Argentina
The two teams had met in six previous matches, including three times in the FIFA World Cup group stage, all won by Argentina (1994: 2–1; 2002: 1–0; 2010: 1–0).

Before the match, Nigeria were the only team yet to concede in the tournament, but their defence were breached inside three minutes when Ángel Di María's shot hit the post and Lionel Messi slammed home the rebound. Nigeria, which would qualify for the knockout stage if they gained a point or if Iran failed to beat Bosnia and Herzegovina in the other match, equalised within a minute, when Michel Babatunde fed Ahmed Musa, and he cut inside and curled the ball into the net. Messi put Argentina in front in first half injury time with a direct free kick, but Musa equalised once again early in the second half, after playing a one-two with Emmanuel Emenike and scored. Argentina, which needed only a point to win the group, then scored the game winner when a corner from Ezequiel Lavezzi was flicked on by an Ezequiel Garay header and Marcos Rojo scored with his knee. Argentina won the group with a perfect record of three wins out of three, while Nigeria were able to qualify as group runners-up despite losing as Iran also lost to Bosnia and Herzegovina in the other match.

Musa became the first Nigerian player to score more than once in a World Cup match.

Bosnia and Herzegovina vs Iran
The two teams had met in five previous matches, all in friendlies, most recently in 2009.

Bosnia and Herzegovina, which had already been eliminated, led 1–0 at half-time through a goal by Edin Džeko, shooting low with his left foot after he received a pass from Miralem Pjanić. Pjanić extended the lead in the second half when he slotted low past the goalkeeper, after receiving a through ball from Tino-Sven Sušić. Iran, which had to win and also hoped Nigeria lost to Argentina to have any chance for qualification to the knockout stage, reduced the deficit after Reza Ghoochannejhad tapped home from close range from a Javad Nekounam cross. However, Bosnia and Herzegovina scored a third goal when Avdija Vršajević slotted home with his right foot after Sejad Salihović played him in on the right, sealing their first win in World Cup finals history, and also confirming Iran's elimination, meaning that they failed to advance to the knockout stage for all four of their World Cup campaigns.

With Ghoochannejhad's goal for Iran, the 2014 World Cup became the first since 1998 in which every participating team managed to score at least once.

References

External links
2014 FIFA World Cup Group F, FIFA.com

Group F
Group
Bosnia and Herzegovina at the 2014 FIFA World Cup
Iran at the 2014 FIFA World Cup
Group